Prince Jerzy Sebastian Lubomirski (20 January 1616 – 31 December 1667) was a Polish noble (szlachcic), magnate,  politician and military commander, and Prince of the Holy Roman Empire. He was the initiator of the Lubomirski Rebellion of 1665–1666 against royal authority.

Lubomirski was the son of voivode and starost Stanisław Lubomirski and Princess Zofia Ostrogska. He was married to Konstancja Ligęza since 1641 and Barbara Tarło since 1654. He was starost of Kraków since 1647, Court Marshal of the Crown in the same year, Grand Marshal of the Crown since 1650, Field Crown Hetman since 1658, starost of Nowy Sącz and Spisz.

He became Sejm Marshal of the ordinary Sejm between 1 February and 29 March 1643 in Warsaw.

Biography
Lubomirski became famous as a commander during wars with the Ukrainian Cossacks, Sweden, Transylvania and Muscovy in the 1648–1660 period. Inter alia he crushes the invading troops of George II Rákóczi and marched into Transylvania. He also forced, together with Stanisław "Rewera" Potocki, Russian troops to surrender at the battle of Cudnów in 1660.

He was a staunch defender of the "Golden freedoms" and the leader of the fierce opposition to King John II Casimir, who was attempting to increase his power.

The King accused him of treason to the state and with an adjudication of guilt adopted by the Sejm, he lost all his offices and was sent into banishment in 1664.

However, in 1665 he started the Lubomirski Rokosz (Rebellion) and countermanded system reforms of the Commonwealth. Using his influence Lubomirski had two sessions of the Sejm dissolved, in 1665 by deputies Piotr Telefus and Władysław Łoś, and in 1666 by deputies Kasper Miaskowski and Teodor Łukomski. At the head of regular army units and some noble levy (pospolite ruszenie) forces, he defeated the Royal army at Częstochowa in 1665 and royal troops led by the future King John III Sobieski  at Mątwy in 1666.

The Agreement of Łęgonice gave him back his dignity and annulled the earlier adjudication of the Sejm, the king was forced to give up his reform plans and the introduction of "vivente rege elections" and resulted in indirect abdication of the monarch in 1668. However, Lubomirski was forced into exile.

Assessment

Some historians see Lubomirski as one of the most significant magnates of the 17th century. He frequently served as a deputy to the Sejm, was an excellent orator, military commander and politician, and had great private ambitions.

At the same time, many question his accomplishments; he was prideful and ambitious has been accused of strange and traitorous behaviour during the war against Sweden (1655–1660). While he contributed to the defeat of the Swedish-allied Transylvanian invaders, he let their leader and top officials go in exchange for nothing (as opposed to holding them for a ransom, or as political pawns). Lubomirski's "victorious" rebellion against the Polish government prevented the realisation of key reforms, which in turn had grave consequences for the Commonwealth in the long term. His only real big accomplishment was the victory at Cudnow, but even that he did not accomplish alone. He also abandoned his army afterwards, seeking praise from the royal court, while the army disintegrated and soldiers went unpaid and wounded were unattended.

Children and famous descendants
 Stanisław Herakliusz become Court and Grand Marshal.
 Aleksander Michał become starost.
 Hieronim Augustyn become Court Marshal, Treasurer and Hetman.
 Krystyna married Feliks Kazimierz Potocki.
 Franciszek Sebastian become starost and Rotmistrz.
 Jerzy Dominik become Podstoli, Podkomorzy and voivode.
 Anna Krystyna married Dominik Mikołaj Radziwiłł and Franciszek Stefan Sapieha.

Ancestry

References

External links 

 Georgius Lubomirski Portrait, painter G.Daniel Schultz. engraver Jeremias Falck

Field Crown Hetmans
Diplomats of the Polish–Lithuanian Commonwealth
Polish people of the Russo-Polish War (1654–1667)
Polish rebels
Jerzy Sebastian
People from Jędrzejów County
1616 births
1667 deaths